Edward Young was Dean of Exeter between 1662 and 1663. He was the father of Edward Young.

Notes

Deans of Exeter
17th-century English clergy